The 2012 Lafayette Leopards football team represented Lafayette College in the 2012 NCAA Division I FCS football season. The Leopards were led by 13th year head coach Frank Tavani and played their home games at Fisher Stadium. They are a member of the Patriot League. They finished the season 5–6, 2–4 in Patriot League play to finish in a three way tie for third place.

Schedule

References

Lafayette
Lafayette Leopards football seasons
Lafayette Leopards football